Giarratano is a surname. It may refer to the following notable people:

 Joseph Giarratano (born 1956), American inmate
 Leah Giarratano, Australian psychologist
 Nino Giarratano (born 1962), American college baseball coach
 Tony Giarratano (born 1982), American baseball player

Italian-language surnames